Kish Khaleh (also Romanized as Kīsh Khāleh; also known as Kesh Khāleh) is a village in Chubar Rural District, Ahmadsargurab District, Shaft County, Gilan Province, Iran. At the 2006 census, its population was 148, in 42 families.

References 

Populated places in Shaft County